Notre-Dame-de-la-Croix de Ménilmontant (meaning Our Lady of the Holy Cross of Ménilmontant) is a Roman Catholic parish church located in Ménilmontant, in the 20th arrondissement of Paris, France.

History

Prior to the 19th century, the hamlet of Ménilmontant depended on the parish church of Saint-Jean-Baptiste de Belleville. Responding to population growth in the neighbourhood, the parish priest ordered the construction of a chapel in the rue de la Mare in 1823. In 1847 the chapel was designated a parish.

Construction of the present structure began in 1863, following the plans of Héret. Consecration occurred in 1869, though the building was yet incomplete.

During the Paris Commune, the church was appropriated as a political club. In a meeting held in the church on 6 May 1871, the Commune voted to execute the Archbishop of Paris and his fellow hostages.

The construction was completed in 1880.

Exterior

Interior

Grand Organ

The organ was built by Aristide Cavaillé-Colle in 1872 to 74. The design of the church presented many difficulties that ultimately meant the organ was not completed as intended. In particular, the rose window required the organ cases to be split either side of the window. The presence of a bell mechanism further hindered construction of the organ. In the end, the intended positiv division was never built because it was impossible to route the key mechanism from the console to the pipes. In addition, the console had to be positioned facing the organ rather than facing the church. The third manual on the console was made to play the recit and grand orgue coupled together. When completed, the organ had 26 stops in total. The current organist is Frédéric Denis.

References

Roman Catholic churches in the 20th arrondissement of Paris
Churches completed in 1880